Sphicosa coriacea is a species of dance flies, in the fly family Empididae.

References

Empididae
Insects described in 1889
Diptera of South America
Taxa named by Jacques-Marie-Frangile Bigot